The Bishop of Sodor and Man is the Ordinary of the Diocese of Sodor and Man (Manx Gaelic: Sodor as Mannin) in the Province of York in the Church of England. The diocese only covers the Isle of Man. The Cathedral Church of St German where the bishop's seat is located, is in the town of Peel. St German's was elevated to cathedral status on 1 November 1980.

The bishop is an ex officio member of the Legislative Council of the Isle of Man (the upper house of Tynwald, the parliament of the Isle of Man) and of Tynwald Court. The bishop's residence is Thie yn Aspick (Bishop's House), Douglas.

The right to appoint the Bishop of Sodor and Man is vested in the British crown; the Monarch acts, perhaps somewhat anomalously (in view of Man's status as a Crown Dependency), on the advice of the Prime Minister. However, unlike diocesan bishops in England, who are formally elected by the canons of the cathedral church in accordance with the monarch's congé d'elire, the Bishop of Sodor and Man is appointed directly by the monarch by letters patent.

Peter Eagles was appointed Bishop of Sodor and Man, and was installed at the Cathedral Church of St German at Peel on 30 September 2017. On 8 March 2023 he announced his retirement, to take effect on 28 October 2023.

Diocese

The name "Sodor and Man" is from an earlier diocese which included not only the Isle of Man but also the Hebrides. The name for this whole area in the original Norse was Suðreyjar (Sudreys or "southern isles"). In Latin, the corresponding adjective was Sodorensis, later abbreviated in the English title as Sodor. 
In the Middle Ages, the diocese was considered part of Scotland, and was under the control of neither the Archbishop of York nor the Archbishop of Canterbury. During the Great Schism, the Pope created a different line of bishops in the southern part of the diocese which became part of the Church of England. An Act of Parliament in 1542, during the reign of King Henry VIII, included the diocese in the Province of York. The termination "and Man" appears to have been added in the 17th century, as later generations did not realise that "Sodor" originally included the Isle of Man. The designation "Sodor and Man" had become a fixture by 1684.

Tables

(Dates in italics indicate de facto continuation of office)

List of known Bishops of Mann

List of Bishops of Mann and the Isles

The bishops of Mann and the Isles were also styled bishops of Sodor (Old Norse: Suðreyjar; ; meaning Southern Isles, which comprised the Hebrides, the islands of the Firth of Clyde and the Isle of Man).

List of Bishops of Sodor and Man

Assistant bishops
In contrast with mainland dioceses, the Manx diocese seldom (if ever) has assistant bishops, whether full- or part-time, stipendiary or retired.

In fiction 
The Bishop of Sodor and Man is mentioned in the song "If you Want a Receipt for that Popular Mystery" sung by Colonel Calverley in the operetta Patience (1881) by Gilbert and Sullivan. The song lists the elements of a Heavy Dragoon, including "Style of the Bishop of Sodor and Man". The reference is to Rowley Hill (Bishop 1877-1887).

The fictional Island of Sodor, home to Thomas the Tank Engine, is named after the diocese. In addition, the Sudrian Locale known popularly as Rolf's Castle is named after Roolwer.

Notes

References 
 Haydn, Joseph, Haydn's Book of Dignities. Horace Ockerby. (1994, 1969 reprint)
 Manxman's Homepage via the Internet Archive Wayback Machine
 National Archives. See of Sodor and Man, 12 August 2003 (Appointment of Graeme Paul Knowles)
 New, Anthony S.B., The Observer's Book of Cathedrals Frederick Warne & Co Ltd.
 Pepin, David, Discovering Cathedrals Shire Publications Ltd.
 Powicke, F. Maurice and E. B. Fryde Handbook of British Chronology 2nd. ed. London: Royal Historical Society 1961
 Tudor Place
 Whitaker, Joseph. Whitaker's Almanack 1883 to 2004. J. Whitaker & Sons Ltd/A&C Black 2004

 
Bishops of the Diocese of Sodor and Man
Sodor and Man